Sleeper is a surname. People with this name include:

 Albert Sleeper 1862–1934, American politician from Michigan
 Charles Sleeper 1856–1924, American physician and politician from Maine
 David L. Sleeper 1856–1914, American politician from Ohio
 Henry Davis Sleeper 1878–1934, American antiquarian, collector, and decorator
 Jim Sleeper born c1947, American author and journalist
 John Sherburne Sleeper (1794–1878), Massachusetts sailor, novelist, journalist, and politician
 Josiah Sleeper 18??–1946, American businessman in Pennsylvania, founder of Sleeper's College
 Martha Sleeper 1910–1983, film and Broadway actress
 Samantha Sleeper born c1987, fashion designer
 Thomas Sleeper 1956–2022, American composer

Surnames